Maya Karin Roelcke is a Malaysian film actress, television host and singer, known for Pontianak Harum Sundal Malam, Anak Halal, Ombak Rindu and Munafik 2. She holds the Malaysia Film Festival record for the actress with most nominations in the category of Best Actress Award (11), and is among the few actresses who have won the award twice. She is also the first of only two Malaysian actresses to have won the Best Actress Award at the Asia-Pacific Film Festival.

Early life
Roelcke was born in October 1979 in Bayreuth, Bavaria, West Germany. She is of German, Malay, Chinese and Indian Muslim descent. Her father is from Germany and her mother is from Penang, Malaysia. She lived most of her teenage years in different parts of Indonesia, finally ending up in Kuala Lumpur, Malaysia when she was 17. She is the oldest of three siblings. She graduated from Limkokwing University of Creative Technology Kuala Lumpur in Media and Marketing studies before starting her acting career.

Career

2000–2004
In 2000, she was cast as a television show host for Malaysia's TV3 lifestyle entertainment programme Wavelength, which began her mainstream career. She was soon cast in her first film role as one of the leads in Aziz M. Osman's Seri Dewi Malam alongside popular actor Hairie Othman. Later that year, she played a girl living in a rural village in her second movie No Problem which was a box office failure. She won the New Popular Artist Award at Malaysia's Anugerah Bintang Popular Berita Harian and the Anugerah Media Hiburan in 2001. In 2003 she was cast in a supporting role in, Mr. Cinderella 2.

In mid-2004, she was cast by director Shuhaimi Baba in the lead role in  Pontianak Harum Sundal Malam. She won the Best Actress Award at the 49th Asia Pacific Film Festival 2004 in Fukuoka, Japan. She also received her first nomination for Best Actress in a Leading Role at the Malaysia Film Festival.

2005–2010

In 2005, Roelcke reprised her role as the lead in Pontianak Harum Sundal Malam II and won Best Actor (male/female) at the Estepona Fantasy and Terror Film Festival 2005 in Málaga, Spain and, her second nomination for Malaysia Film Festival's Best Actress. Roelcke also won the Most Popular Actress (Film) Award at the Anugerah Bintang Popular Berita Harian 2005.

Despite her growing film career, Roelcke continued her involvement in television, and in 2004 she was invited by Channel [V] International to join their VJ team. In 2006, she was voted Best VJ in Star Buzz Editor's Choice Awards 2006. Other shows that she has hosted are the bridal programme 'Ratu Sehari' (Queen for a Day) in 2004 for Malaysia's Astro Ria channel and the travelogue programme 'Beauty Secrets From The East' in 2005 for TV3.

In 2007, Roelcke played a variety of lead roles in Pesona Pictures' Waris Jari Hantu and 1957: Hati Malaya and Tayangan Unggul's Anak Halal and continued to receive nominations for various awards. Karin won Best Actress Awards at Malaysia Film Festival and Anugerah Oskar Malaysia in 2008 for her portrayal of a tomboy girl in Anak Halal.

In 2008 she began to play comedy film roles. Beginning with Duyung in 2008, she played the title role of a mermaid, performing all the underwater scenes on her own in the open sea of Sipadan Island. In the same year, she received her second Most Popular Actress (Film) Award at the Anugerah Bintang Popular Berita Harian 2008. In 2009, she starred in Pisau Cukur, a comedy film about gold diggers where she performed more comedy scenes than her role in Duyung.

In 2010 in the romantic comedy movie Cun, she played a famous entertainment show host who falls in love with a man from a rural village alongside Remy Ishak.

2011–present: Career challenge and further success 
In November 2011, Roelcke had her biggest commercial success Ombak Rindu, where she played a young women from a rural village struggling with life and love For this she won the Best Actress Award at both the Anugerah Skrin and Malaysia Film Festival in 2012 and her third Most Popular Actress (Film) Award at the Anugerah Bintang Popular Berita Harian 2011.

After Lagenda Budak Setan 2, she appeared in Sejoli, wher she portrayed a girl looking for her true love, gaining her Best Actress award in Comedy Role at the second Anugerah Lawak Warna in 2014. Next were Jwanita and Nota, a collaboration between local and Japanese film producers.

In 2017, Roelcke appeared in the horror film, Munafik 2 directed by Syamsul Yusof, becoming the highest-grossing Malaysian film to date with a record of RM48 million in sales, also gaining commercial success in Indonesia, Brunei, and Singapore as well.

Musical career 
In 2002, Roelcke recorded her debut music album, Erti Cinta, and was nominated for the Best New Singer and Best Video awards at the Anugerah Industri Muzik. Her second album is Bukan Qalamaya (2004). In 2013, Roelcke signed with Warner Music Malaysia returning after 9 years with the single "Bintang Syurga". Her next album Teka-Teki was released on 24 March 2014.

Advertising
Roelcke has advertised various products starting with Wella in 2001, followed by Pantene, Yishion in 2003, Celcom in 2006, L'Oréal Paris Malaysia in 2007. Other endorsements include Tag Heuer, Nescafe, Innershine, Dulux, Vono. Sorella and GreenTech Malaysia.

Activism
Having been influenced by her father, Roelcke has been very passionate about the environment from a young age. Roelcke is actively involved in various campaigns for environmental and animal protection and often works with the Malaysian Nature Society and World Wildlife Fund (WWF).

She also has her own campaign drive MayaLovesNature, the first two of which involved working with 22,000 schoolchildren from 14 different primary schools targeting awareness of excessive use and waste of plastic bags. 2012 sees her as ambassador for the governments new recycling initiative and as spokesperson for the Geological Institute of Malaysia.

In January 2019, Roelcke was appointed as the ambassador for River of Life,  a public outreach programme initiated by Malaysia's Ministry of Federal Territories which aims to transform the Klang River into a vibrant and livable waterfront of high economic value. Her popular #MayaRiverChallenge began when Karin uploaded a photo of her dipping her head into a stream to social media, which was then mimiced by many others.

Filmography

Film

Television series

Television

Music videos

Theatres and musicals

Discography
 Erti Cinta (2001)
 Bukan Qalamaya (2004)
 Teka-Teki (2014)

References

External links

1979 births
Living people
Malaysian film actresses
Malaysian women pop singers
Malaysian people of German descent
Malaysian people of Malay descent
Malaysian Muslims
Malaysian people of Chinese descent
VJs (media personalities)
Malaysian people of Indian descent
Malay-language singers
Malaysian television actresses
21st-century Malaysian actresses
German emigrants to Malaysia
Citizens of Malaysia through descent
German people of Indian descent
German people of Chinese descent
German people of Malaysian descent
German people of Malay descent
German Muslims
Pesona Pictures contract players
KRU Studios contract players
Malaysian rhythm and blues singers
21st-century Malaysian women singers